TJ Sklotatran Poltár is a Slovak football team, based in the town of Poltár. In year 2021 club will be 100. anniversary. Club have 5 youth teams and first team. 

First team play at V. league SsFZ gr. south

U19 - IV. league U19 SsFZ gr. south

U15 - II. league U15 SsFZ gr. south

U13 - II. league U13 SsFZ gr. south

Club have also team U11 and team U9.

Current squad

Colours
Club colours are red and white.

External links
  
Club profile at Futbalnet.sk 
Official website of a club 

Football clubs in Slovakia
Association football clubs established in 1921